A general counsel, also known as chief counsel or chief legal officer (CLO), is the chief in-house lawyer for a company or a governmental department.

In a company, the person holding the position typically reports directly to the CEO, and their duties involve overseeing and identifying the legal issues in all departments and their interrelation, including engineering, design, marketing, sales, distribution, credit, finance, human resources and production, as well as corporate governance and business policy. This would naturally require in most cases reporting directly to the owner or CEO overseeing the very business on which the CLO is expected to be familiar with and advise on the most confidential level. This requires the CLO/general counsel to work closely with each of the other officers, and their departments, to appropriately be aware and advise.

Historically, general counsel often handled administrative tasks while outside lawyers in private practice handled more complex legal work. Since the 1980s, however, the general counsel position has become increasingly prominent in multinational companies, often directly advising the board of directors in place of outside lawyers. General counsel are now often among the most highly paid executives of major American corporations, and prominent American government lawyers and law firm partners are often hired for general counsel roles at prominent companies. Similar trends are also being seen in the United Kingdom and other countries.

General counsel often have broad roles encompassing crisis management, compliance reporting management and public policy advocacy. Many companies also hire in-house counsel to handle specialized tasks such as tax work, mergers and acquisitions, labor law and intellectual property, sometimes building in-house practice groups that rival the practices of major law firms.

Organizations

Global

The Association of Corporate Counsel

The Association of Corporate Counsel ("ACC") has 35,000 general counsel, chief legal officer and other in-house counsel members located in 90 countries. ACC was founded as the American Corporate Counsel Association in 1982 and now includes more than 55 chapters, including in Argentina, Canada (four chapters), Europe, Israel, the Middle East and Singapore. Members have access to networking opportunities and education events through their regional chapter affiliations as well as global connections across practice area, job title and industry. ACC provides members with resources to deliver services and advice to their companies, promotes the value of in-house legal services and advocates on behalf of general counsel. For its general counsel and chief legal officer members, ACC hosts roundtables where members discuss current practice trends and issues.

United States

The General Counsel Forum

The Forum is an association of 700 general counsel and senior managing counsel. The non-profit organization was founded in the fall of 1998 as the Dallas-Fort Worth General Counsel's Management Practices Forum (“DFWGCMPF”). The association is a partnership between in-house members and outside counsel, known as underwriters. Members are general counsel and managing counsel of corporations, non-profit organizations and government agencies. The mission of the Forum is to improve the professional lives of general counsel and managing counsel through meaningful opportunities for peer-to-peer interaction and knowledge exchange, mentoring through professional development in legal best practices, ethics, governance, and compliance. In November 2000, the DFWGCMPF changed its name to The Texas General Counsel Forum, also known as The Forum, and in the following year the Houston Chapter was formed, and then the Austin-San Antonio Chapter was founded. In July 2005, the Forum hired a chief executive officer with the mandate to improve the efficiency and effectiveness of the organization, expand membership, and launch the organization nationally. In November 2009, the Board of Directors approved expanding the Forum nationally, and dropped the reference to Texas, becoming simply The General Counsel Forum. In the fall of 2012, the General Counsel Forum founded the Chicago Chapter.

United Kingdom
In the United Kingdom a group of general counsel, called the GC100, was officially launched on 9 March 2005 and brings together the senior legal officers of more than eighty-five FTSE 100 companies. The GC100 group was created in response to the increasing volume and complexity of domestic and international law and regulation which impacts on UK listed companies. The group was formed with the support of Practical Law Company which acts as its secretariat.

The main objectives of the GC100 are to:

 Provide a forum for practical and business focused input on key areas of legislative and policy reform common to UK listed companies.
 Enable members to share best practice in relation to law, risk management, compliance and other areas of common interest.

Membership of the GC100 is by invitation only. At the AGM on the 16 January 2007 members voted in favour of extending membership to company secretaries as well as general counsel in the FTSE 100. The formal name of the GC100 is now "The Association of General Counsel and Company Secretaries of the FTSE100", although it will continue to be known as the GC100.

Mark Harding, the first chair of the GC100, has stated that the GC100 is not a campaigning body, although they work closely with the FD100 (a similar grouping of blue chip finance directors).

See also
 Corporate lawyer
 Corporation counsel
 Enterprise legal management

References

External links
 The General Counsel Forum
 Silicon Valley Association of General Counsel
 All Hands Meeting

Management occupations
Lawyers by type